Jafar is a fictional character in Walt Disney Pictures' 31st animated feature film Aladdin (1992). He is voiced by Jonathan Freeman, who also portrayed the character in the Broadway musical adaptation. Jafar also appears in the 1994 sequel to Aladdin, but he is not in the 1996 third film or the TV series.

An inspiration to the character is the villain Jafar, played by Conrad Veidt in The Thief of Bagdad, from which Aladdin borrows several character ideas and plot elements. The Jafar of Disney's Aladdin plays essentially the same part as the character from the 1940 film, and is drawn with notable similarity to Veidt's looks. He is loosely based on the real-life Persian Abbasid vizier Ja'far ibn Yahya.

Development 
Animator Andreas Deja decided to design Jafar in a way he was contrasting to the other characters, with many vertical lines against the curvy designs based on Al Hirschfeld. 

Jonathan Freeman, who composers Alan Menken and Howard Ashman met when he auditioned for Little Shop of Horrors and had previously invited Freeman to audition for both The Little Mermaid and Beauty and the Beast, said that the artwork was what got him truly interested in the role. He stated that "once I saw those heavy lidded eyes, that long narrow face, I knew that Jafar was going to be something really special." He was the first actor cast, and spent one year and nine months recording dialogue; he went months without any other actors to interact, and later interrupted theater tours to fly to Los Angeles and record newly written lines. When Deja first met Freeman, he was surprised to see the lack of physical similarity to the character, but included some of Freeman's acting and gesturing into Jafar's animation.

Appearances

Aladdin 

In the 1992 adaptation of Aladdin, where he is voiced by Jonathan Freeman, Jafar is the grand vizier of Agrabah, the Sultan's most trusted advisor. He is also an evil and sinister sorcerer who strongly dislikes being second best. Jafar secretly plots to obtain the Genie's magical oil lamp and rule Agrabah. Early in the film, Aladdin is imprisoned in the palace dungeons, as arranged by Jafar due to his influence over the guards. He lies to Princess Jasmine claiming Aladdin has already been executed while he pretends to be shocked that he had mistakenly believed that Aladdin abducted her. Jafar (disguised as a fellow prisoner) approaches Aladdin, striking a deal with him. In exchange for Aladdin's help in retrieving the lamp from the Cave of Wonders, Jafar reveals an escape route from the prison and promises him a reward if he succeeds, it is soon revealed that the reward is death. When the plan fails, Aladdin and the lamp are lost. The Sultan later scolds Jafar for supposedly executing an innocent life behind his back without consulting him, in which Jafar pretends to regret his actions and promises not to do it again. When his pet parrot Iago suggests an alternative plan, Jafar decides to use the hypnotic powers of his cobra-headed staff to manipulate the Sultan into mandating a marriage between himself and Jasmine. This plan also instigates Jafar's limerence towards Jasmine and thus he genuinely wants to have her as his bride. However, he is impeded by Aladdin, who had discovered the Genie and used his first wish to become a Prince. Seeing “Prince Ali” as a potential threat to his plans and a rival for Jasmines’s hand in marriage, he plots to dispose of him. After a second attempt by Jafar on his life, Aladdin (with the help of the Genie and his second wish) survives and then exposes Jafar's plot against the Sultan; however, Jafar learns that Aladdin possesses the lamp before making his escape. 

Iago steals the lamp from Aladdin and Jafar becomes the Genie's new master. Jafar uses his first two wishes to become Sultan and the world's most powerful sorcerer. Jafar assumes control of the palace (which is lifted off the ground and put on the main top of a mountain by Genie) and banishes Aladdin to a frozen wasteland. Jafar then turns the Sultan into a puppet, allowing Iago to torture the Sultan by force-feeding him crackers as revenge for the crackers the Sultan fed Iago. A horrified Jasmine begs Jafar to stop and Jafar does so. Jafar, seeking a queen to rule Agrabah alongside him, offers Jasmine his hand in marriage. Jasmine angrily refuses and throws a cup of wine in his face. An angered Jafar decides to use his final wish to wish for Jasmine to fall desperately in love with him. Genie tries to inform Jafar that he cannot use his magic to make people fall in love, but Jafar, grabbing him by the beard, demands him to do it anyway. Their argument causes him to not notice that Aladdin has returned and Jasmine decides to help Aladdin steal back the lamp by pretending that she is now in love with Jafar. Jafar, believing that Genie has somehow granted him his wish, goes up to Jasmine to seduce her without realizing she is tricking him. He notices Aladdin, however, from the reflection of Jasmine's crown, and he realizes the whole thing was a ruse.

Aladdin battles Jafar (who has turned into a giant cobra) and taunts him with the fact that he is only the second-most powerful being on Earth after Genie, who was the one who gave him his power in the first place and can very easily take it away. Realizing that what Aladdin says is true and that he’s still “second best”, Jafar, consumed by his hunger for power, uses his final wish to become an all-powerful genie, in an attempt to rule the whole universe. However, as Jafar revels in his newfound phenomenal cosmic power, he finds out too late that Aladdin has tricked him into wasting his wish on becoming a genie, since genies are not free beings, and becomes trapped in a magic lamp of his own, and the lamp is sent into the Cave of Wonders by the Genie.

The Return of Jafar 

In The Return of Jafar, Jafar's lamp is found by Abis Mal, who releases Jafar from the lamp. Jafar plots to get revenge on Aladdin. He nearly succeeds at killing Aladdin and taking control of the palace, but Iago, who has changed sides, thwarts his plans and destroys his lamp with the lava, obliterating Jafar for good in the resulting explosion. As a result, Jafar was never seen again in Aladdin and the King of Thieves nor in the television series, but was often referred to by name by the other character (namely Iago).

Hercules (1998 TV series) 

In an episode of Hercules: The Animated Series called "Hercules and the Arabian Night", Jafar makes another attempt at revenge and is  resurrected by Hercules's arch-enemy, Hades. He has lost his status as an all-powerful immortal genie after dying, but Hades gives him a new cobra staff that makes him flesh and blood as long as he holds it, and the two villains team up to get rid of Aladdin and Hercules. However, due to Aladdin's wit and Hercules's strength, Jafar is defeated for the final time, being pulled into the River Styx forever.

Aladdin (2019 film) 

Depicted younger in the 2019 live-action version, Jafar is still the grand vizer, but more emphasis is placed on his past as a thief in his youth and his ambition to use Agrabah to invade the kingdom of Shirabad out of revenge for his time in its dungeons. The Sultan's wife and Princess Jasmine's late mother, the Queen, was stated to have been a Princess of Shirabad prior to her marriage to the Sultan, and it is possible that Jafar arranged her murder as both revenge for his imprisonment and possibly to instigate war between the two kingdoms. The film also presents Jafar as a foil to Aladdin, the former explicitly comparing their thief backgrounds and desire to improve their social status. While Aladdin wants just enough to live comfortably, Jafar is shown to never be satisfied with what he has gained as long as there are those greater than himself. Aladdin uses that character flaw to trick Jafar into using his last wish to become a genie, resulting in his imprisonment and being thrown into the Cave of Wonders by the Genie. Marwan Kenzari played the role.

Kingdom Hearts 
Jafar debuted in Kingdom Hearts as one of the members of Maleficent's inner circle. Here, he plans to use The Heartless and take over Agrabah while he attempts to locate both Jasmine (as she is one of the Princesses of Heart) and Agrabah's Keyhole. Jafar eventually manages to steal Genie's lamp from Aladdin and kidnap Jasmine in the process. Sora, Aladdin, Donald Duck and Goofy track him to the Cave of Wonders, where Jafar used his first wish to reveal the world's keyhole. Upon arrival in the lamp chamber, they engage Jafar in battle after he used his second wish to enlist Genie's help in the fight. Upon his defeat, Jafar uses his final wish to become a Genie and battles the team again, only to be defeated and sealed away in the lamp.

In Kingdom Hearts II, Jafar's lamp is found by the Peddler, making him a target for Pete as he reveals his intent to make Jafar into a Heartless under his control.
Once Pete is driven off, the lamp is placed within the palace for safe keeping. However, Jafar is later released by the Peddler and he threatens Iago into helping him get Sora and his friends on a wild goose chase to their death while he captures Princess Jasmine. After the heroes arrive, with Iago taking a hit meant for Aladdin, Sora defeats Jafar, causing him to implode with his lamp dissolving soon after. Facsimiles of Jafar appear in Kingdom Hearts: Chain of Memories, based on Sora's memories, and Kingdom Hearts: Coded, based on the digitized data from Jiminy's Journal. Jonathan Freeman voiced Jafar in both games.

Descendants

Jafar appears in Descendants alongside Maleficent, Cruella de Vil, and the Evil Queen, as part of a group of Disney villains who are the parents of the film's four main characters, with Maz Jobrani playing the role. In the film, he is the father of Jay, who steals items for his father's store.

Other appearances 
In the Disney's Hollywood Studios version of Fantasmic! Nighttime Show Spectacular, Jafar is one of the villains the Evil Queen evokes to fight Mickey Mouse and ruin his imagination. Jafar appears with Maleficent, Ursula and Oogie Boogie in Walt Disney World's Magic Kingdom Halloween-themed fireworks program HalloWishes at Mickey's Not-So-Scary Halloween Party. In the StarKid Productions musical Twisted, a parody of both Aladdin inspired by the musical Wicked, Jafar is a main character and the storyline tells the Aladdin story from his point of view. Jafar is featured in many episodes of Disney's House of Mouse where he is often found in the audience. In one episode "Donald's Lamp Trade", Jafar hypnotizes Donald Duck to steal a lamp for him, but it turns out that he only wanted a clock-like lamp and not the real magical one. Jafar also appears in another episode "Pete's House of Villains" in which he keeps the other Aladdin characters from coming into House of Mouse. He also appears briefly in Mickey's Magical Christmas: Snowed in at the House of Mouse and appears in Mickey's House of Villains as the main antagonist and the leader of Disney Villains.

A live-action version of Jafar appears in the Once Upon a Time spin-off Once Upon a Time in Wonderland. Naveen Andrews portrays the character, an ally of the Red Queen. In this continuity, Jafar is the illegitimate son of the Sultan, and his interest in genies stems from his mentor and lover, Amara, who discovered a ritual that could be used to rewrite the laws of magic using the power of three genies and two sorcerers. Jafar betrayed Amara by transforming her into his serpent staff so that he could have her power for himself. Andrews did not reprise his role in Once Upon a Time's sixth season due to a scheduling conflict, and he was replaced by Oded Fehr.

References 

Aladdin (franchise) characters
Animated characters introduced in 1992
Disney animated villains
Fictional Arabs
Fictional genies
Fictional hypnotists and indoctrinators
Fictional kidnappers
Fictional shapeshifters
Fictional viziers
Fictional wizards
Film characters introduced in 1992
Male characters in animated films
Male characters in animation
Male film villains
Video game bosses